Hemiptelea is a genus of flowering plants belonging to the family Ulmaceae.

The species of this genus are found Temperate Asia.

Species:
 Hemiptelea davidii (Hance) Planch. (thorn-elm)

References

Ulmaceae
Rosales genera